Chaharmahali Turkic (Chaharmahali Turkic: چارمحال توْرکی‌سؽ) is a proposed Oghuz Turkic variety spoken in Iran's Chaharmahal and Bakhtiari Province, and western Isfahan Province where it is described as "Esfahan Province Turkic" by linguists. It is an understudied and generally unclassified variety of Oghuz Turkic distinct from Azerbaijani and Qashqai, being closer to the latter. Chaharmahali Turkic is not to be confused with "Chārmāhāli," a Persian dialect spoken in the same region.

Language Distribution 
The Atlas of the Languages of Iran (ALI) published a point-based and polygon language distribution map of Chaharmahal and Bakhtiari Province, and several linguistic data maps.

See also
Qizilbash
Azerbaijani language
Qashqai language

References

Oghuz languages
Agglutinative languages
Vowel-harmony languages
Oghuz Turks
Turkic languages